Elena Barolo (born 14 December 1982, in Turin) is an Italian actress, showgirl and blogger.

In 2002, Barolo began appearing as one of the veline on the Italian television program Striscia la notizia. Barolo appeared in this role alongside Giorgia Palmas until 2004. Barolo then developed a career as an actress, appearing as a main cast member in the soap opera CentoVetrine from 2005 to 2007, and again in the sitcom series 7 vite in 2007 and 2009. In 2011, she appeared in the feature films Ex - Amici come prima! and Un Natale per due.

In January 2012, Barolo started a fashion blog called "Affashionate".

Filmography

Cinema

Television

References

External links

Affashionate.com

1982 births
Italian film actresses
Living people
Actors from Turin
Italian television actresses
Italian showgirls
Mass media people from Turin